Nikos-Georgios Stratakis (born 11 December 1983 in Piraeus) is a Greek professional football midfielder who plays for Greek second division side Ethnikos Piraeus F.C.

Stratakis signed with Diagoras F.C. on a free transfer from Asteras Tripolis in the summer of 2009.

References

External links
Profile at The Football League's website

1983 births
Living people
Greek footballers
Asteras Tripolis F.C. players
Ethnikos Piraeus F.C. players
Association football midfielders
Footballers from Piraeus